The Monongahela City Bridge, officially the General Carl E. Vuono Bridge, spans the Monongahela River from the City of Monongahela in Washington County, Pennsylvania to Forward Township in Allegheny County, Pennsylvania. It was constructed to replace a bridge which was 1/4 of a mile north of its location at First and Main Streets, and it opened to traffic in 1990.

The bridge marks the end of Monongahela's Main Street and the separation of Pennsylvania Route 136 from Pennsylvania Route 88. This is the fourth bridge to cross this segment of the river. The 1836 Williamsport Bridge was a wooden structure that served Monongahela while the town was under its original name. After this bridge was consumed in a fire, a four-frame truss bridge was constructed in 1884. This was soon replaced by a three-frame bridge in 1910, which stood until the erection of the current structure in 1990.

Bridges completed in 1990
Bridges in Washington County, Pennsylvania
Bridges in Allegheny County, Pennsylvania
Road bridges in Pennsylvania
Girder bridges in the United States